Busungarna was a Swedish early-mid 1980s pop group, consisting of Rickard Gunnarsson, Patrick Tokarski, Carl Westerberg and Malcolm Murrey. They scored a 1982 success with the Christmas song Tomten, jag vill ha en riktig jul.

Discography

Albums
Tjena, vi är Busungarna - 1984

Singles
Tomten, jag vill ha en riktig jul/Skvallerbytta bing bång - 1982
Äntligen sommarlov/Busvitsar del 2 - 1984
Vi vill ha fred/Julbus runt granen - 1985

References

1982 establishments in Sweden
1985 disestablishments in Sweden
Musical groups established in 1982
Musical groups disestablished in 1985
Swedish musical groups